The languages of the Soviet Union are hundreds of different languages and dialects from several different language groups.

In 1922, it was decreed that all nationalities in the Soviet Union had the right to education in their own language. The new orthography used the Cyrillic, Latin, or Arabic alphabet, depending on geography and culture. After 1937, all languages that had received new alphabets after 1917 began using the Cyrillic alphabet. This way, it would be easier for linguistic minorities to learn to write both Russian and their native language. In 1960, the school educational laws were changed and teaching became more dominated by Russian. Moreover, the Armenian and Georgian, as well as the Baltic Soviet Socialist Republics were the only Soviet republics to maintain their writing systems (Armenian, Georgian and Latin alphabets respectively).

Language policy

Background 
Before the Bolshevik Revolution, Russian was the official language for the Russian Empire, with the exception of a few permitted languages in autonomous regions as Poland, Finland, and the Baltic provinces. Regional languages were discouraged or forbidden, as was the case of Ukrainian between 1876 and 1905. There was no explicit plan to enable non-Russians to learn Russian, and there was no possibility for other ethnic groups to develop their own culture and language.

In this period, some individual efforts developed written forms for some of these languages, but they had limited effect and they were focused on missionary activities. In the case of languages with written tradition, as Armenian, Georgian, Turkic languages of Central Asia, and Tadzhik, their writing system continued being used, but mainly in connection with religious education.

Soviet language policy 
In 1914 Vladimir Lenin was opposed to the idea of a compulsory or official state language. Equality of all peoples and of all languages was a commitment made by Lenin and his associates before and after the October Revolution. As a result no single language was designated for official use in the Soviet Union and the existence of the spoken languages of the national minorities was guaranteed. Everyone had the right to use their own language, both in private and public, as well as in correspondence with officials and while giving testimony in court. The USSR was a multilingual state, with around 130 languages spoken natively. Discrimination on the basis of language was illegal under the Soviet Constitution, though the status of its languages differed.

However, the Soviet Union faced the problem of unifying the country, and for that reason, Russian was selected as the common language to facilitate communication between members of different ethnic groups.

In 1975, Brezhnev said "under developed socialism, when the economies in our country have melted together in a coherent economic complex; when there is a new historical concept—the Soviet people—it is an objective growth in the Russian language's role as the language of international communications when one builds Communism, in the education of the new man! Together with one's own mother tongue one will speak fluent Russian, which the Soviet people have voluntarily accepted as a common historical heritage and contributes to a further stabilization of the political, economic and spiritual unity of the Soviet people."

Developing writing systems 
Few of the languages of the Soviet state had written forms. One of the first priorities of the Soviet state was the creation of writing systems and the development of literacy programs. New or modified writing systems were adopted for over half of the languages spoken in the territory during the early Post-revolutionary years. In some particular cases, preparatory work was required before the creation of an orthography due to the lack of previous linguistic analysis, as in the case of languages of the Far North.

When a language had already a writing system, there were attempts for making it easier to learn and accessible. As part of this policy, in 1918 Russian orthography was simplified removing orthographic distinctions without phonetic counterpart. Phonemic or close to phonemic orthographies weren't modified, such as Armenian, Georgian, or Chuvash.

Writing systems based on the Arabic script caused major problems because they were poorly adapted to indicate phonemic differences that are found in Turkic languages or North-East Caucasian languages. A first attempt tried to create a simplified form of Arabic script. However, the task was abandoned. Instead, the Latin alphabet was used for all languages of the Soviet Union without a traditional alphabetical writing system, avoiding the impression that the policy was a Russification attempt.

Written forms were developed for several languages with a very small number of speakers, such as the Finno-Ugric languages Karelian, Veps, and Lapp. However, many of these writing systems had a short life. In the case of Itelmen, never was put into practical use. Other languages that received their writing systems during the 1920s and early 1930s kept using them, such as Nanay, Nivkh, Koryak, Chuckchi, Khanty, and Mansi.

Distribution and status

East Slavic languages (Russian, Belarusian and Ukrainian) dominated in the European part of the Soviet Union, the Baltic languages Lithuanian and Latvian, and the Finnic language Estonian were used next to Russian in the Baltic region, while Moldovan (the only Romance language in the union) was used in the southwest region. In the Caucasus alongside Russian there were Armenian, Azeri and Georgian. In the Russian far north, there were several minority groups who spoke different Uralic languages; most of the languages in Central Asia were Turkic with the exception of Tajik, which is an Iranian language.

Although the USSR did not have de jure an official language over most of its history, until 1990, and Russian was merely defined as the language of interethnic communication, it assumed de facto the role of official language. For its role and influence in the USSR, see Russification.

On a second level were the languages of the other 14 Union Republics. In line with their de jure status in a federal state, they had a small formal role at the Union level (being e.g. present in the Coat of arms of the USSR and its banknotes) and as the main language of its republic. Their effective weight, however, varied with the republic (from strong in places like in Armenia to weak in places like in Byelorussia), or even inside it.

Of these fourteen languages, two are often considered varieties of other languages: Tajik of Persian, and Moldovan of Romanian. Strongly promoted use of Cyrillic in many republics however, combined with lack of contact, led to the separate development of the literary languages. Some of the former Soviet republics, now independent states, continue to use the Cyrillic alphabet at present (such as Kyrgyzstan), while others have opted to use the Latin alphabet instead (such as Turkmenistan and Moldova – although the unrecognized Transnistria officially uses the Cyrillic alphabet).

The Autonomous republics of the Soviet Union and other subdivision of the USSR lacked even this de jure autonomy, and their languages had virtually no presence at the national level (and often, not even in the urban areas of the republic itself). They were, however, present in education (although often only at lower grades).

Some smaller languages with very dwindling small communities, like Livonian, were neglected, and weren't present either in education or in publishing.

Several languages of non-titular nations, like German, Korean or Polish, although having sizable communities in the USSR, and in some cases being present in education and in publishing, were not considered to be Soviet languages. On the other hand, Finnish, although not generally considered a language of the USSR, was an official language of the Karelia and its predecessor as a Soviet republic. Also Yiddish and Romany were considered Soviet languages.

Distribution of Russian in 1989

See also
Index of Soviet Union-related articles
Education in the Soviet Union
Korenizatsiya
Russification
Languages of Russia
Languages of Kazakhstan
Languages of Ukraine

References

Sources
 Bernard Comrie. The Languages of the Soviet Union. CUP 1981.  (hb),  (pb)
 E. Glyn Lewis. Multilingualism in the Soviet Union: Aspects of Language Policy and Its Implementation. The Hague: Mouton Publishers, 1971.
 Языки народов СССР. 1967. Москва: Наука  5т.

Further reading

External links
Soviet Language Policy in Central Asia by Mark Dickens

Soviet culture
Language policy in Russia